Milenko Radomar Vesnić (Vesnitch in French, and Wesnitsch in German; 13 February 1863 – 15 May 1921) was a Serbian politician, diplomat, cabinet member and prime minister.

Biography
Vesnić studied law at la Grande École of Belgrade and at the University of Munich since 1883. On 8 August 1888 Vesnić received a Ph.D. in law with a thesis under the title "The Blood Feud among South Slavs". His highly praised thesis was published in German the following year in Stuttgart. Two next two years Vesnić spent in Paris (1888–1889) and in London (1889–1890), for further specialization in law. He joined the diplomatic service of Serbia in 1891, as the secretary of the Serbian Legation at Constantinople. In 1893, Vesnić was appointed as a university professor teaching international law at Grande École in Belgrade and the same year became MP in the National Assembly of Serbia as a member of the People's Radical Party.

In the government of Sava Grujić (1893–1894), Vesnić was the Minister of Education and Religious Affairs. In 1899 he was sentenced to two years in prison after he insulted King Milan I. In 1901 Vesnić returned to the diplomatic service as the Minister of Serbia in Rome. 

In 1904, Vesnić was appointed Serbian Minister in Paris, a posting he held for almost 17 years in various terms. In the Radical cabinet of Nikola Pašić in 1906 Vesnić was Minister of Justice and afterward returned to Paris, as the Minister of Serbia to France. After the Balkan Wars, Vesnić was a member of the Serbian delegation at the Conference of Ambassadors in London (1912–1913).

During the First World War, Milenko R. Vesnić successfully organized various conferences in favour of the war effort of Serbia. 

A collection of his speeches and articles in French papers and journals was published in Paris in 1921 under the title:  "Serbia through the Great War ("La Serbie à travers la Grande Guerre").

Milenko R. Vesnić was elected a corresponding member of the Académie des Sciences Morales et Politiques in Paris.

Vesnić was the diplomatic representative from Serbia at the Paris Peace Conference at Versailles in June 1919. He was married to the American Blanche Ulman who was acquainted with President Wilson's wife. Vesnić travelled to Washington prior to the Peace Conference to meet with Wilson and explain the Serbian position with respect to the break-up of the Austro-Hungarian Empire.  He also represented Serbia at the League of Nations Conference in January 1919. 

Vesnić became Prime Minister of the Kingdom of Serbs, Croats and Slovenes in 1920, and during his office, he signed the Rapallo Treaty with Italy. During his second government (1920–1921), Vesnić retained the portfolio of Foreign Minister as well.

A talented scholar Vesnić wrote dozens of studies regarding international law in general and the position of Bosnia-Herzegovina in the international system after the Austro-Hungarian occupation in 1878, in particular.  

Vesnić translated important university textbooks on international and criminal law from French and German into the Serbian language, as well as the book on Prince Miloš Obrenović rule, written in French by his Italian physician Bartholomeo Cunibert.

Selected works
Milenko R. Wesnitsch, Die Blutrache bei den Südslaven: ein Beitrag zur Geschichte des Strafrechts, Stuttgart: Gebrüder Kröner, 1889.(PhD thesis in German language).
Milenko R. Vesnitch, La Serbie à travers la Grande Guerre, Bossard, Paris 1921.

See also
 Gliša Geršić
 Dragutin Pećić

References

Sources

External links
 Photographs

1863 births
1921 deaths
Ambassadors of Yugoslavia to France
People from Zlatibor District
People from the Principality of Serbia
People's Radical Party politicians
Government ministers of Serbia
Prime Ministers of Yugoslavia
Serbian diplomats
Academic staff of Belgrade Higher School
Academic staff of the University of Belgrade
Education ministers of Serbia
Justice ministers of Serbia